Mabel Amos was an American Secretary of State of Alabama from 1967 to 1975.

She was born on June 3, 1900, in Brooklyn, Conecuh County, Alabama. She attended Alabama College, now known as University of Montevallo, State Teachers College at Troy University and Peabody College in Nashville, TN. In 1939, she was appointed Secretary to the Governor. Shortly after, she was promoted to recording secretary and served in that role for six Gubernatorial administrations.

She died on November 5, 1999.

References

External links 
http://www.archives.alabama.gov/conoff/amos_m.html

1900 births
1999 deaths
alabama Democrats
University of Montevallo alumni
Troy University alumni
Peabody College alumni